The seventh season of the American crime thriller television series The Blacklist premiered on NBC on Friday, October 4, 2019 at 8.00 p.m. The season was originally set to contain 22 episodes. The impact of the COVID-19 pandemic forced the show to shut down production; the season was cut to 19 episodes, with the season finale containing some animated sections to complete the episode.

The series continues to be produced by Davis Entertainment, Universal Television and Sony Pictures Television, and executive produced by Jon Bokenkamp, John Davis, John Eisendrath, John Fox and Joe Carnahan.

Premise
At the end of previous season, Raymond (James Spader) is kidnapped by Katarina Rostova (Laila Robins), Liz's mother and former Russian agent who wants the informations about being framed by her closest people and hunted by Townsend's Directive. Her conflict with him also enters the conflict with Elizabeth and FBI Task Force. During the season, Katarina disguises as friendly neighbour to Liz to enter into her life. When Liz discovers more about her past and relationships with Raymond, her father Dom Wilkinson (Brian Dennehy), and Ilya Kozlov (Brett Cullen), this forces her to choose the side: Raymond or Rostova.

Cast

Main cast
 James Spader as Raymond "Red" Reddington
 Megan Boone as Elizabeth Keen
 Diego Klattenhoff as Donald Ressler 
 Harry Lennix as Harold Cooper
 Amir Arison as Aram Mojtabai
 Hisham Tawfiq as Dembe Zuma

Recurring
 Laila Robins as Katarina Rostova
 Natalie Paul as Francesca Campbell
 Elizabeth Bogush as Elodie Radcliffe
 Laura Sohn as Alina Park
 Clark Middleton as Glen Carter
 Brett Cullen as Frank Bloom / Ilya Kozlov
 Jonathan Holtzman as Chuck
 Anthony Michael Hall as Robby Ressler

Episodes

Production
In March 2019, NBC renewed the series for a seventh season, with the original cast set to reprise their roles. On March 14, 2020, Sony Pictures Television suspended production on the series following the COVID-19 pandemic. The final episode utilizes animation to complete the episode, as it had been in the middle of filming when production was suspended. The actors were able to record dialogue for the animation from their homes. The producers considered having the cast "read their lines while an old fashioned radio appeared on the TV screen, or just putting voiceover to still comic book frames" before settling on fully animated sequences. Thought bubbles and text boxes were also added "to help bridge the gap" between the animated sequences and the live action footage. The animation was created by previsualization studio Proof, Inc in London and Atlanta, and was made to look like the style of The Blacklist comics and old Batman comics. 35 artists worked to create approximately 20 minutes of footage for the episode. Additionally, the plots from the three unproduced episodes were being considered for season eight.

Casting
Laura Sohn joined the cast as a new Task Force member Alina Park. Joely Richardson had been cast as Cassandra Bianchi. The character has been described as "elegant, charming and ruthless", and is a former lover of Raymond Reddington.

Ratings

References

External links
 
 

2019 American television seasons
2020 American television seasons
7
Television productions suspended due to the COVID-19 pandemic